Brian Becker may refer to:

Brian Becker, member of the Connecticut House of Representatives
Brian Becker, character in The Listener (TV series)
Brian Becker (baseball) in 1998–99 Australian Baseball League team rosters